Something to Tell You is the second studio album by American pop rock band Haim. It was released on July 7, 2017, by Columbia Records. The album's lead single, "Want You Back", was released on May 3, 2017, followed by the release of the promotional single "Right Now". On May 10, the album cover was revealed, along with the preorder announcement. "Little of Your Love" was then announced as the second single on June 18, 2017, via Twitter. "Nothing's Wrong" was released as the third single on August 21, 2017.

Background and recording
Haim toured for two years to support their previous release, Days Are Gone, the three sisters' 2013 debut album that was met with a great deal of critical and commercial success. With the conclusion of their tour came the beginning of the process of crafting Something to Tell You: "All we knew for two years was wake up, soundcheck, play the show, go to sleep and fit in a slice of pizza at some point. We needed to turn our brains from touring brains back to writing brains. When we came home, we literally got off the bus, took a nap and went right into the studio." The initial sessions for the album were unfruitful; the band questioned the quality of the songs, wondering if they were on par with the debut album. However, a breakthrough came after the producers of the 2015 Judd Apatow–directed romantic comedy Trainwreck asked the band to write a song for the film's soundtrack. "Little of Your Love", the album's second single, was produced in under a week at the film producers' request, and although it was ultimately not selected for the soundtrack, completing the song gave the band the confidence they needed to write new material for the album.

In the following years, the band developed the album, taking breaks and continuing to perform at various shows and festivals, much of which would further inspire the album. During the production of the album, Ariel Rechtshaid, one of the producers and Danielle Haim's partner, was diagnosed with testicular cancer. His diagnosis is cited by the band as the reason for the four-year delay between their first and second album as they halted production while Rechtshaid underwent treatment. The band switched between Valentine Studios, an infrequently used 1970's production facility in Valley Village (a neighborhood in Los Angeles, California), and Rechtshaid's home studio.

Promotion
"Want You Back" was released as the album's first single on May 3, 2017, and was followed a week later by the promotional single, "Right Now". On May 13, the band performed "Want You Back" along with "Little of Your Love" on Saturday Night Live.

Director Paul Thomas Anderson filmed a documentary about the making of the album. Titled Valentine, the film was first screened in July 2017, before being officially uploaded to the internet that September. Anderson would go on to direct music videos for three of the album's tracks "Right Now", "Little of Your Love", and a live version of "Night So Long". Anderson became interested in the group after learning that the sisters were the daughters of one of his former art teachers.

They made their first UK appearance at BBC Radio 1's Big Weekend on May 27, performing "Want You Back" and "Right Now" as part of their set.

The trio also embarked on their second headlining tour, the Sister Sister Sister Tour which begun on April 3, 2018.

Critical reception

Something to Tell You has received a generally positive reception from music critics. At Metacritic, which assigns a normalized rating out of 100 to reviews from mainstream critics, the album has an average score of 69 out of 100 based on 30 reviews, which indicates "generally favorable" reception.

Writing for Pitchfork, Jenn Pelly said, "No other rock band in popular music (an anomalous statement already) has mixed styles so seamlessly—rattling and gliding from one hook to another...Haim's latticed arrangements and heavily percussive melodies make their music fly." Pelly as well as several other reviewers stressed the influence of Stevie Nicks and other 1970s and '80s rock; in the Los Angeles Times, Mikael Wood said the album "makes you believe that rock might have a future," bearing "the polished sound of vintage Fleetwood Mac and the Eagles, and here the sisters continue to rely on guitars and the like at a moment when many of their peers have little use for them." In Rolling Stone, Jon Dolan said, "You can hear the studied sense of craft all over Something to Tell You...These songs don't always explode with the sunny ebullience of the first LP, but the melodies, beats and ideas are layered and piled high." In The Guardian, Kitty Empire writes, "Haim really know what they are doing. There are digressions to kill for here, what you might once have called middle eights, indefatigable melodies, and weird little noises – a horse neigh and a seagull coda on Want You Back, a fax machine on Found It in Silence, the gasping on Nothing's Wrong – to keep you clamping your headphones to your ears in delight."

Commercial performance
Something to Tell You debuted at number seven on the US Billboard 200 with 32,000 album-equivalent units, of which 26,000 were pure album sales. It also debuted at No. 2 on the UK Albums Chart, selling 18,319 copies in its first week.

Track listing

Notes
  signifies an additional producer

Personnel
Credits adapted from AllMusic and album’s liner notes.

Haim
 Alana Haim – vocals , guitar , percussion , keyboards 
 Danielle Haim – vocals , guitar , drums , percussion , Hi-hat , synthesizer , glass bottle 
 Este Haim – vocals , bass guitar , percussion 

Musicians
 Rostam Batmanglij – acoustic guitar , drum programming  , electric guitar , harmonizer , Moog Bass , piano , rhythm guitar , synthesizer 
 Matt Bauder – saxophone 
 Andrew Bulbrook – violin 
 Lenny Castro – congas 
 Devonté Hynes – DX7 electric piano 
 Jim-E Stack – keyboards 
 Tommy King – bass synth , CP70 , organ , piano , synthesizer 
 Greg Leisz – guitar , pedal steel guitar , slide guitar 
 George Lewis Jr. – guitar 
 Roger Manning – synthesizer 
 Serena McKinney – violin 
 David Moyer – saxophone 
 Nico Muhly – prepared piano and strings 
 Mike Olsen – cello 
 Owen Pallett – viola 
 Ariel Rechtshaid – acoustic guitar , background vocals , celeste , guitar , keyboards , marimba , organ , percussion , piano , rhythm guitar , synthesizer , vocoder 
 Buddy Ross – dulcimer , Fender Rhodes , keyboards , percussion , synthesizer 
 Gus Seyffert – percussion 
 Ruud Wiener – Simmons Silicon Mallet 

Technical personnel
 Chris Allgood – assistant mastering engineer
 Rostam Batmanglij – additional production , engineer , producer , string arrangements 
 BloodPop – additional production 
 Martin Cooke – assistant engineer 
 Rich Costey – mixing 
 Laura Coulson – photography
 John DeBold – engineer 
 Scott Desmarais – assistant mixing engineer 
 Robin Florent – assistant mixing engineer 
 Nicolas Fournier – assistant engineer 
 Dave Fridmann – mixing 
 Chris Galland – mixing engineer 
 Michael Harris – engineer 
 Chris Kasych – engineer 
 Emily Lazar – mastering
 George Lewis Jr. – producer 
 Ted Lovett – creative director
 Manny Marroquin – mixing 
 Serena McKinney – string arrangements 
 Rob Orton – mixing  
 Ariel Rechtshaid – drum programming , engineer , producer , programming , string arrangements 
 Nick Rowe – engineer 
 David Schiffman – engineer 
 Gus Seyffert – engineer

Charts

Weekly charts

Year-end charts

Certifications

Release history

References

External links

2017 albums
Haim (band) albums
Columbia Records albums
Albums produced by Ariel Rechtshaid
Albums produced by Rostam Batmanglij
Albums recorded at Electro-Vox Recording Studios